Right-On is the third album of jazz and pop standards by Swiss jazz drummer Charly Antolini featuring UK tenor sax player Dick Morrissey.

Track listing 

"The Night Has a Thousand Eyes" (Jerry Brainin & Buddy Bernier)   	
"You've Changed" (Carey & Fischer)
"Just Look at Me Now" 	
"I Concentrate on You" (Cole Porter)	
"I'm Walking"
"The Gypsy" (Billy Reid)
"London by Night"	(Carroll Coates) 
"I Got It Bad (And That Ain't Good)" (Ellington & Webster) 	
"You and the Night and the Music" (Schwartz & Dietz)

Personnel

Charly Antolini – drums
Dick Morrissey – tenor saxophone
Brian Dee – piano
Len Skeat – bass

Dick Morrissey albums
1993 live albums